Destini Beard is an American singer and songwriter based out of Pennsylvania. She works mostly in alternative and new age music and is best known for her work with the group Midnight Syndicate. Her father, Ed Beard, Jr., is a world-famous fantasy artist and provides the cover art for Destini's works.

Early years
Beard started out singing and acting through high school plays and musicals. Then, in 2008, she began working with the Susquehanna Valley Chorale, along with several other music programs.

Work with Midnight Syndicate
Starting in the fall of 2009, Beard began to work with the gothic group Midnight Syndicate. They released their first album together in 2010, entitled The Dark Masquerade. Songs from this album were then featured in The Dead Matter: Original Motion Picture Soundtrack.

Awards
The Dead Matter: Original Motion Picture Soundtrack, which Beard worked on with Midnight Syndicate, won an award for Best B-Movie Soundtrack at the 2011 Golden Cob Awards.

References

External links

Destini's Official YouTube
The Official Myspace of Destini Beard Music
The Official Facebook of Destini Beard Music

American sopranos
American women singer-songwriters
1991 births
Living people
21st-century American women singers